The Attorney-General for Pakistan is the chief law officer and legal advisor of the Government of Pakistan and enjoys rights of audience before Parliament. The Attorney-General, who serves as Pakistan's public prosecutor, is nominated by the Prime Minister and appointed by the President. The Constitution bars the Attorney-General from private practice until the termination of his or her employment. The office was established in 1947.

The previous Attorney-General was Ashtar Ausaf Ali, whose resignation was accepted on 19 January 2023; the Attorney-General-designate, Mansoor Usman Awan, recused himself from appointment. The longest-serving Attorney-General is Sharifuddin Pirzada, whereas Aziz A. Munshi held the office the most number of times, in four instances.

List of attorneys-general 
 Ministry
 Muslim League (2)
 (9)
 (6)
 (2)
 (4)
 (13)

See also
Attorney General

References

External links
 Attorney General for Pakistan

Supreme Court of Pakistan
Pakistani lawyers
Cabinet of Pakistan
Pakistan federal departments and agencies
Ministry of Law and Justice (Pakistan)